In a Blue Mood is a studio album by Kay Starr. It was released in 1955 by Capitol Records (catalog no. T-580).

Upon its release, Billboard magazine wrote that the 12 songs selected for the album show Starr "at her bluesy best" with songs allowing her to display "atmosphere and mood". AllMusic gave the album a rating of two stars.

Track listing
Side A
 "After You're Gone"
 "A Woman Likes to Be Told"
 "Maybe You'll Be There"
 "I'm Waiting for Ships That Never Come In"
 "What Will I Tell My Heart"
 Evenin'"

Side B
 "He's Funny That Way"
 "I Got the Spring Fever Blues"
 "Don't Tell Him What Happened to Me"
 "I Got It Bad, and That Aint' Good"
 "Everybody's Somebody's Fool"
 "It Will Have to Do Until the Real Thing Comes Along"

References

1955 albums
Kay Starr albums
Capitol Records albums